Aleksandr Fyodorovich Tarkhanov (born 6 September 1954) is a Russian football coach and a former Soviet player.

International career
Tarkhanov made his debut for USSR on 28  November 1976 in a friendly against Argentina. He played in a 1982 FIFA World Cup qualifier, but was not selected for the final tournament squad. He also played in one qualifier for UEFA Euro 1984 (USSR did not qualify for the final tournament).

Coaching career
On 11 April 2019, he signed with the Armenian club Pyunik.

On 30 October 2019, Tarkhanov became Vice President of Development with Assistant manager Suren Chakhalyan being appointed acting Head Coach.

Personal life
His son Yuri Tarkhanov is a professional football coach and a former player.

References

External links
 Profile 

1954 births
People from West Kazakhstan Region
Living people
Soviet footballers
Soviet Union international footballers
Soviet football managers
Russian football managers
Russian expatriate football managers
Soviet Top League players
PFC CSKA Moscow players
FC SKA Rostov-on-Don players
SC Odesa players
SC Odesa managers
FC Akhmat Grozny managers
Expatriate football managers in Uzbekistan
Pakhtakor Tashkent FK managers
PFC CSKA Moscow managers
FC Torpedo Moscow managers
PFC Krylia Sovetov Samara managers
FC Saturn Ramenskoye managers
FC Kuban Krasnodar managers
FC Khimki managers
FC Ural Yekaterinburg managers
Russian Premier League managers
FC SKA-Khabarovsk players
Expatriate football managers in Bulgaria
PFC Slavia Sofia managers
Honoured Coaches of Russia
Communist Party of the Soviet Union members
Association football forwards
FC Yenisey Krasnoyarsk players
FC Pyunik managers
Expatriate football managers in Armenia
FC Yenisey Krasnoyarsk managers